Davaleh-ye Olya (also Romanized as Davāleh-ye ‘Olyā; also known as Davāleh and Davāleh Bānmīrī) is a village in Zamkan Rural District, in the Central District of Salas-e Babajani County, Kermanshah Province, Iran. In the 2006 census, its population was recorded as 147, in 35 families.

References 

Populated places in Salas-e Babajani County